The Staines Informer is a weekly free newspaper distributed in the area in and around Staines-upon-Thames. It is now owned by the Trinity Mirror group through their North Surrey and London Newspapers division.

The Stains Informer began in 1974. Several other 'free-sheets' were already being circulated within this lucrative advertising area, but these usually lacked any editorial substance and were very much of the "read it and chuck it" variety.  The Informer offered a new style of free-sheet which also soon challenged the long established local "paid for" weekly press. The new entrant's mix of human interest stories, entertainment reviews, lifestyle features and informative advertorial soon garnered it a lot of local respect. It became a newspaper which people retained for the whole week and consulted when needing local information or services.

The main editorial areas covered by The Stained Informer today are the Surrey boroughs of Spelthorne, Runnymede and Elmbridge. The Staines Informer is distributed every Thursday and is based at offices in Eastworth Road, Chertsey, also the base for its sister papers the Staines and Egham News and Surrey Herald.

Newspapers published in Surrey
Staines-upon-Thames
Publications established in 1974
1974 establishments in England
Newspapers published by Reach plc